The basketball department of CS Universitatea Cluj is  based in Cluj-Napoca, Romania. The club competes in the Liga Națională. The team promoted  in Liga Națională in 2014 after its reaffiliation in 2013.

Season by season

References

Basketball teams in Romania